James Smith Havens (May 28, 1859 – February 27, 1927) was an American lawyer and politician who served part of one term as a U.S. Representative from New York from April 1910 to March 1911, having been elected to fill a mid-term vacancy.

Biography 
Born in Weedsport, New York. He attended the public schools and Munro Collegiate Institute, Elbridge, New York and graduated from Yale College in 1884. He moved to Rochester the same year and studied law. He was admitted to the bar in 1887 and commenced practice in Rochester.

Family 
He was the father of noted artist James D. Havens. He learned of research being done by Banting and Best in Canada, and his son Jim became the first American to use insulin.

Political career 
He was a delegate to the Democratic National Convention in 1904. He was elected as a Democrat to the Sixty-first Congress to fill the vacancy caused by the death of James B. Perkins (April 19, 1910 – March 3, 1911). He  was not a candidate for renomination in 1910.

Later career and death 
Havens resumed the practice of his profession in Rochester.

He declined the Democratic nomination for mayor of Rochester in 1913. He was vice president and secretary of the Eastman Kodak Company, and head of its legal department from 1919 until his death and interment in Mount Hope Cemetery in 1927.

References

New York Times, James S. Havens, Noted Lawyer, Dies, February 28, 1927

1859 births
1927 deaths
Yale College alumni
Democratic Party members of the United States House of Representatives from New York (state)
Kodak people
Politicians from Rochester, New York
People from Weedsport, New York
Lawyers from Rochester, New York
19th-century American lawyers